In 1971, the ISU congress decided to hold a World Junior Speed Skating Championships. After two test-championships (1972 and 1973), where only a boys' competition was held in the 1972 edition, the first official championship was introduced in Cortina d'Ampezzo. In this championship boys and girls could enter. Since this championship the World Junior Speed Skating Championships are held every year.

The distances the boys have to skate in a championship were the 500m, 1500m, 3000m, and the 5000m. In 2015 the 1000 metres replaced the 3000m as part of the allround competition. Girls have the 500m, 1000m, 1500m and the 3000m on the programme. In 2002 the team pursuit was added to the allround competition and the 2009 edition saw the introduction of medals for the individual distances. In 2015 the team sprint and mass start events were added. The 2021 edition was cancelled due to the COVID-19 pandemic.

Summary

Medal table

List of medallists (boys)

List of medallists (girls)

See also 
 ISU Junior World Cup Speed Skating
 List of world cups and world championships for juniors and youth

Notes

References 
 Medal Winners in World Junior Championships

 
Junior
All-round speed skating
World youth sports competitions
Recurring sporting events established in 1974